The Williams FJ44 is a family of small, two-spool, turbofan engines produced by Williams International for the light business jet market. Until the recent boom in the very light jet market, the FJ44 was one of the smallest turbofans available for civilian applications.  Although basically a Williams design, Rolls-Royce was brought into the project at an early stage to design, develop, and manufacture an air-cooled high-pressure (HP) turbine for the engine. The FJ44 first flew on July 12, 1988 on the Scaled Composites/Beechcraft Triumph aircraft.

The Williams FJ33 is a newer, smaller engine based on the basic FJ44 design.

Development
Production started in 1992 with the  thrust FJ44-1A.
The uprated to  FJ44-2A was introduced in 1997.
The  thrust FJ44-3A was introduced in 2004.
In 2005, a new low end version, the FJ44-1AP, was introduced, with a  takeoff thrust.
Released in 2007 was the new  thrust FJ44-4. In 2010 this engine was in use on the Cessna CJ4, and since 2018 also on the new Pilatus PC-24.

Design 

The FJ44-1A has a single stage blisk fan plus a single intermediate pressure (IP) booster stage, both driven by a 2 stage low pressure (LP) turbine, and supercharging a single stage centrifugal high pressure (HP) compressor, driven by a single stage uncooled high pressure (HP) turbine. The combustor is an impingement cooled annular design.  Fuel is delivered to the combustor through an unusual rotating fuel nozzle system, rather than the standard fuel-air mixers or vapourisers. The bypass duct runs the full length of the engine.
The FJ44-2A has two additional booster compressor stages.

Variants
FJ44-1A
  thrust, production started in 1992,  diameter fan, SFC at full thrust at SLS, ISA is understood to be 0.456 lb/(hr lbf), 
FJ44-1AP
  takeoff thrust, introduced in 2005, 5% better specific fuel consumption, lower internal temperatures, similar to the -1A with a higher pressure ratio fan, a new combustor and LP turbine, a new full length bypass duct/exhaust mixer and a dual channel FADEC.
FJ44-1C
FJ44-2A
  thrust, introduced in 1997, larger  diameter fan, with two additional booster stages to increase core flow, centrifugal compressor throttled-back aerodynamically to a lower HPC pressure ratio than the -1, exhaust mixer and a fuel electronic control unit.
FJ44-2C
  thrust, similar to the -2A with an integrated hydromechanical fuel control unit.
FJ44-3A
  thrust, 2004 introduction, similar to the -2A with a larger fan and dual channel FADEC unit.
 FJ44-3A-24
  thrust, derated -3A.
FJ44-3AP
  thrust.
FJ44-4A
  thrust, released in 2007, hi-tech fan of larger diameter than the -3 unit. Used on the Cessna CJ4 and the Pilatus PC-24.
FJ44-4M
Williams-Rolls F129
Military designation for the derated FJ44-1C with 1500lbf (6.672kN) power output.

Applications

Specification

See also

References

External links

 Williams International product page

Medium-bypass turbofan engines
1980s turbofan engines
FJ44
Centrifugal-flow turbojet engines